Anthony Langella (born 24 April 1974 in Gennevilliers) is a former French cyclist. He competed in the men's team pursuit at the 2004 Summer Olympics.

Career achievements

Major results

1995
1st Tour de Gironde
1998
1st stage 4 Tour de l'Avenir
2nd Grand Prix de Fourmies
2000
3rd Duo Normand (with Frédéric Finot)
3rd Tour du Finistère
2004
1st World Cup Team Pursuit (with Fabien Merciris, Jérôme Neuville and Fabien Sanchez)
2005
 National Points Race Champion
 National Team Pursuit Champion (with Mathieu Ladagnous, Mickaël Malle and Fabien Sanchez)

Grand Tour general classification results timeline

References

1974 births
Living people
French male cyclists
French track cyclists
Sportspeople from Hauts-de-Seine
Olympic cyclists of France
Cyclists at the 2004 Summer Olympics
Cyclists from Île-de-France